QV44 is one of several tombs located in the Valley of the Queens intended for the use of Ramesses III's sons. The painted reliefs decorating Khaemwaset E's tomb illustrate his ritual and symbolic journey in the Afterlife as he meets the main gods of that region as well as the genies who guard the gates of the kingdom of Osiris.

QV44 is one of several tombs constructed for the sons of Ramesses III. Others are QV55 (Amun-her-khepeshef), QV53 (Ramesses), QV43 (Seth-her-khopsef, and QV42 (Pareherwenemef). Abitz argues that the princes are identified with the Four sons of Horus and are all real sons of the King. The decorations in these tombs focus more on the King than on his sons.

The tomb

The tomb consist of a corridor, two side rooms, a second corridor and an inner room. The first part of the corridor is decorated with scenes showing King Ramesses III before a variety of gods and goddesses, including Ptah, Thoth, Anubis, Ra-Harakhty, Geb and more.

The side chambers include scenes of the Sons of Horus and the goddesses Isis, Nephtys, Neith and Serket.

The second corridor includes a scene showing Khaemwaset as an Iunmutef priest. Other scenes depict the Book of Gates.

The inner room is decorated with scenes showing the King before several gods and goddesses. Finds include part of a sarcophagus lid and remains of Canopic jars.

References

External links
 Tomb of Khaemwaset Plan and description of tomb
 

Buildings and structures completed in the 12th century BC
Valley of the Queens
Ramesses III